Timothy Peter Pigott-Smith,  (13 May 1946 – 7 April 2017) was an English film and television actor and author. He was best known for his leading role as Ronald Merrick in the television drama series The Jewel in the Crown, for which he won the British Academy Television Award for Best Actor in 1985. Other noted TV roles included roles in The Chief, Midsomer Murders, The Vice, The Suspicions of Mr Whicher, King Charles III and two Doctor Who stories (The Claws of Axos (1971) and The Masque of Mandragora (1976)). Pigott-Smith appeared in many notable films including: Clash of the Titans (1981), Gangs of New York (2002), Johnny English (2003), Alexander (2004), V for Vendetta (2005), Quantum of Solace (2008), Red 2 (2013) and Jupiter Ascending (2015).

Early life
Pigott-Smith was born in Rugby, Warwickshire, the son of Margaret Muriel (née Goodman) and Harry Thomas Pigott-Smith, who was a journalist. He was educated at Wyggeston Boys' School, Leicester, King Edward VI School, Stratford-upon-Avon and Bristol University. He trained as an actor at the Bristol Old Vic Theatre School.

Career

Film and television 
After a long career in smaller roles, Pigott-Smith's appearance as Arthur Llewellyn Davies in the BBC's The Lost Boys mini-series led to his gaining his big break with the leading role of Ronald Merrick in the 1984 television serial The Jewel in the Crown. Other appearances include the title role in the crime drama series The Chief (1990–1993), a recurring role in ITV drama The Vice as Ken Stott's nemesis, Vickers, and Bloody Sunday. He appeared in two adaptations of Elizabeth Gaskell's North and South; in the 1975 version he played Frederick Hale and in 2004 he played Frederick's father Richard. In 1995, he starred in a serial of the series Ghosts.

He appeared twice in Doctor Who: in the stories The Claws of Axos (1971) and The Masque of Mandragora (1976).

He was a regular narrator of documentary television series. He narrated The Team: A Season with McLaren, a six-episode BBC series about the 1993 season with McLaren Racing. He also narrated the Battlefield series, which examines pivotal battles of the Second World War from an operations point of view. Later, he narrated a series on the British Royal Family, entitled Monarchy: The Royal Family at Work. The series followed Queen Elizabeth II for more than a year, including the 2007 state visit to the United States.

From 2011 to 2014, he portrayed Commissioner Mayne in the ITV drama series The Suspicions of Mr Whicher, written by Helen Edmundson.

He appeared in Lewis in 2015 as a taxidermist in the episode "One For Sorrow". He also appeared on the ITV series, Downton Abbey in the third series' (third season) fifth episode as obstetrician/gynaecologist Sir Philip Tapsell, who was present at the death of Lady Sybil Crawley Branson (Jessica Brown Findlay) from eclampsia after giving birth to her daughter.

His film career included the 2004 film Alexander, The Four Feathers, Clash of the Titans, Gangs of New York, Johnny English, The Remains of the Day and V for Vendetta. He also appeared as Major General Robert Ford in director Paul Greengrass's Bloody Sunday (2002), and as the Foreign Secretary in the James Bond film Quantum of Solace (2008). In February 2010 Piggott-Smith played Alan Keen in the television film On Expenses. He also had a cameo appearance as Sniggs in the BBC production of Evelyn Waugh's Decline and Fall in 2017. His final film role was that of Sir Henry Ponsonby, Queen Victoria's Private Secretary, in Victoria & Abdul (2017).

Stage and radio 

Pigott-Smith worked in the theatre in Shakespearean and Greek roles, including Posthumus in John Barton's 1974 production of Cymbeline for the Royal Shakespeare Company. In early stage roles he was credited as "Tim Smith".

In 2011 he took the title role in King Lear at the West Yorkshire Playhouse, Leeds.

Contemporary works included Enron, playing Ken Lay, for the Chichester Festival Theatre, and then London, in 2009 and Tobias in A Delicate Balance at the Almeida Theatre, London in 2011. He returned to the Almeida in 2014 as a post-accession Charles, Prince of Wales in King Charles III, for which he received a nomination for the Olivier Award for Best Actor, and his first Tony Award nomination for its production on Broadway in 2015. He also appeared as Charles in the 2017 film adaptation of the play.

He was also a radio actor, appearing in many productions on BBC Radio 4.

Writing
During the making of The Jewel in the Crown, Pigott-Smith wrote a diary on his impressions of India. This was published together with an anthology of poetry and prose under the title Out of India.

He wrote two children's books in the series The Baker Street Mysteries, featuring the exploits of Sherlock Holmes' Baker Street Irregulars – The Dragon Tattoo (2008) and Shadow of Evil (2009). He played Holmes in a BBC Radio adaptation of The Valley of Fear.

Death
Pigott-Smith was found dead on 7 April 2017, aged 70. His death was attributed to natural causes. He had been scheduled to appear in a touring production of Death of a Salesman, with opening night in Northampton only three days later. His wife Pamela Miles was also originally scheduled to appear in the play but had withdrawn after breaking a bone and needing surgery. He is buried on the east side of Highgate Cemetery.

Filmography and more

Film

Television

Audiobook narration

Awards and honours
Pigott-Smith won the BAFTA Award for Best Actor in 1985, for his role in The Jewel in the Crown.
In 2014–15, he was nominated for the Laurence Olivier Award and the Tony Award for his lead role in the play King Charles III. He was appointed an Officer of the Order of the British Empire (OBE) in the 2017 New Year Honours for services to drama.

Awards and nominations

References

External links
Tim Pigott-Smith at the British Film Institute

Tim Pigott-Smith(Aveleyman)

1946 births
2017 deaths
English male film actors
English male radio actors
English male stage actors
English male television actors
20th-century English male actors
21st-century English male actors
Male actors from Warwickshire
People from Rugby, Warwickshire
People educated at King Edward VI School, Stratford-upon-Avon
People educated at Wyggeston Grammar School for Boys
Alumni of Bristol Old Vic Theatre School
Alumni of the University of Bristol
Best Actor BAFTA Award (television) winners
Officers of the Order of the British Empire
Burials at Highgate Cemetery